Voitto Aukusti Soini (born February 6, 1938 in Koivisto, Finland) is a retired professional ice hockey player who played in the SM-liiga.  He played for TPS and TuTo.  He was inducted into the Finnish Hockey Hall of Fame in 1986.

External links
 Finnish Hockey Hall of Fame bio
 Voitto and the Eagle

1938 births
Living people
Ice hockey players at the 1960 Winter Olympics
Olympic ice hockey players of Finland
People from Primorsk, Leningrad Oblast
HC TPS players
TuTo players